The Cosmos is a residential skyscraper located in Taichung's 7th Redevelopment Zone, Xitun District, Taichung, Taiwan. Construction of the building began in 2012 and it was completed in 2018. As of January 2021, it is the 22nd tallest building in Taichung.

Design
Cosmos took 6 years from land development to completion. The whole project was jointly constructed by the architect Masatoshi Katayama, Canadian architect Michael Green, and the KYDO design team. In the planning of the public space, the project deployed many luxurious installations, such as the -tall hall on the ceiling of which hangs the only ARS Murano glass chandelier in Asia, of which the market price is about 400,000 euros. It is carefully composed of 120 handmade glass, which won the 2019 European Design Award.

See also 
 List of tallest buildings in Taiwan
 List of tallest buildings in Taichung
 Taichung's 7th Redevelopment Zone

References

2018 establishments in Taiwan
Residential skyscrapers in Taiwan
Skyscrapers in Taichung
Taichung's 7th Redevelopment Zone
Residential buildings completed in 2018
Apartment buildings in Taiwan